Botir Parpiyev (Uzbek: Парпиев Ботир Рахматович, Parpiyev Botir Rahmatovich; born December 23, 1946, Andijan, Uzbek SSR) — Chairman of the State Tax Committee of the Republic of Uzbekistan from 2004 to 2018, Lieutenant general.

Biography 
He was born in Andijan in the family of Rakhmat Parpiyev, a colonel of the militia, who in the 1960s worked in senior positions in the Department of Internal Affairs of the Andijan Regional Executive Committee. From 1970 till 1993 he served in various positions of the Department of Internal Affairs of Andijan Region. From 1994 to 2002 he was Deputy Minister of Internal Affairs of the Republic of Uzbekistan. From June to December 2002 served as Minister of Emergency Situations of the Republic of Uzbekistan. From 2002 to 2004 — Chairman of the State Customs Committee of the Republic of Uzbekistan. In 2003, he received the rank of Lieutenant General of the Customs Service. From 2004 to 2018 — Chairman of the State Tax Committee of the Republic of Uzbekistan. Since 2009, he has also been the President of the Taekwondo Federation of Uzbekistan. On May 11, 2018, he left the post of head of the State tax committee and was appointed Deputy Chairman of the Republican Council for Coordinating the Activities of Citizens' Self-Government Bodies. On February 19, 2020, he was appointed Deputy Minister for Mahallah and Family Affairs of the Republic of Uzbekistan. Since February 2022, he has been retired. He was a deputy of the Supreme Soviet of the Uzbek SSR of the XII convocation, elected in the 1990 parliamentary elections.

Awards 
He was awarded the Certificate of Honor of the Republic of Uzbekistan, the orders of "El-yurt hurmati", "Shon-Sharaf", "Mehnat shuhrati".

References

1946 births
Living people
People from Andijan